The 2015 season of the Indian Premier League, also known as IPL 8 or, for sponsorship reasons, Pepsi IPL 2015, was the eighth season of the IPL, a Twenty20 cricket league established by the Board of Control for Cricket in India (BCCI) in 2007. The tournament featured eight teams and was held from 8 April 2015 to 24 May 2015. The tournament's opening ceremony was held at the Salt Lake Stadium in Kolkata on 7 April 2015. Kolkata Knight Riders were the defending champions having won the title in the 2014 season. The tagline was India ka tyohar (the festival of India.) 

On 24 May 2015, Mumbai Indians defeated Chennai Super Kings by 41 runs in the final at Eden Gardens, Kolkata, to win the IPL title for the second time. Mumbai captain Rohit Sharma was awarded player of the match in the final for his knock of 50 from 26 balls. Andre Russell of the Kolkata Knight Riders was named Most Valuable Player (MVP) of the season.

Players auction

The eight franchises retained a total of 123 players for the 2015 IPL season before moving into the auction. The released players were provided an option to register themselves for auction. Six players were traded across teams before the auction took place. At the 2015 IPL auction held on 16 February at Bangalore, Yuvraj Singh was sold to Delhi Daredevils for 16 crore, a record bid in IPL auction history. A total of 67 players were sold out in the auction and the franchises spent a total of 87.60 crore to buy the players.

Officials
The 2015 IPL season saw 26 match officials, 13 Indian umpires and four match referees officiating. 26 match officials (umpires and referees) participated in a two-day workshop, organised by the BCCI, in preparation for the 2015 IPL season. The workshop was held at the Cricket Centre, Mumbai, on 4 and 5 April 2015, from 9am to 5pm.

Venues
12 venues were selected to host the league stage matches. Mumbai, Pune and Ranchi hosted Qualifier 1, Eliminator and Qualifier 2 respectively and Kolkata hosted the Final.

Group stage

Playoffs

IPL Fanpark initiative
BCCI started a new initiative IPL Fanpark to spread the reach of IPL across the country. As a part of the initiative, IPL was made available in the stadiums across 15 cities, apart from the 12 venues hosting the matches, on a large screen. The access to these stadiums was free and based on first-come first-served basis. Final match at Nashik.

Opening ceremony
The opening ceremony was held at the Salt Lake Stadium in Kolkata, on 7 April 2015. The captains of all eight teams signed the "MCC Spirit of Cricket" pledge. The ceremony featured live performances of Hrithik Roshan, Anushka Sharma, Farhan Akhtar, Shahid Kapoor among others. The ceremony began after a one and a half hours delay due to rain.

Teams and standings

Points table
 Top 4 teams were qualified for the playoffs
  advanced to the Qualifier
  advanced to the Eliminator
("C" refers to the "Champions" of the Tournament. 'R'(2nd Position), '3' and '4' are the positions of the respective teams in the tournament.)

League stage

Matches

 The 20 wides bowled during the match are a record in the IPL 

 The 13 wides bowled by Rajasthan is record in a single innings in the IPL

Playoff stage

Preliminary
Qualifier 1

Eliminator

Qualifier 2

Final

Statistics

Most runs

  The player with the most runs at the end of the tournament received the Orange Cap.
 Source: Cricinfo

Most wickets

  The player with the most wickets at the end of the tournament received the Purple Cap.
 Source: Cricinfo

Most catches

 Source: Cricinfo

References

External links
 
 Tournament website on ESPN Cricinfo

 
Indian Premier League seasons
Indian Premier League
2015 in Indian cricket